The Saimei period  is a chronological timeframe during the Asuka period of Japanese history. The Saimei period describes a span of years which were considered to have begun in the 1315th year of the Yamato dynasty.

This periodization is congruent with the reign of Empress Saimei, which is traditionally considered to have been from 655 through 662.

Periodization
The  adoption of the Sexagenary cycle calendar (Jikkan Jūnishi) in Japan is attributed to Empress Suiko in 604; and this Chinese calendar continued in use throughout the Saimei period.

However, after the reign of Emperor Kotoku, this method of segmenting was temporarily abandoned or allowed to lapse. This interval continued during the Saimei period.

Neither Empress Saimei's reign nor the Saimei periodization are included in the list of nengō for this explicit  duration of time, which comes after Hakuchi and before Suchō.

In the post-Taika or pre-Taihō chronology, the first year of Empress Saimei's reign (斉明天皇元年 or 斉明天皇1年) is also construed as the first year of the Saimei period (斉明1年).

Non-nengō period
Non-nengō periods in the pre-Taihō calendar were published in 1880 by William Bramsen. These were refined in 1952 by Paul Tuschihashi in Japanese Chronological Tables from 601 to 1872.

The pre-Tahiō calendar included two non-nengō gaps or intervals in the chronological series:
Taika, August 645–February 650.
Hakuchi, February 650–December 654.
Non-nengō dating systems
Shuchō, July–September 686.
Non-nengō dating systems
Taihō, March 701–May 704.
Nengō were not promulgated (or were allowed to lapse) during the gap years between Hakuchi and Shuchō, and in another gap between Shuchō and Taihō.

Events of the Saimei period
 654 (Hakuchi 4):  Emperor Kōtoku, in the 10th year of his reign (孝徳天皇10年), dies at age 59; and his nephew and heir declines the succession (senso).  Shortly thereafter, Empress Saimei formally accedes to the throne (sokui).
 655 (Saimei 1) or "the 1st year of Saimei's reign (斉明天皇元年: A new period is marked by the beginning of the reign of Empress Saimei, but the end of the previous nengō in Hakuchi 6 did not presage the commencement of a new nengō.  This dating system was allowed to lapse during Saimei's reign.
 661 (Saimei 7, 7th month): Empress Saimei, in the 7th year of her reign (斉明天皇7年), designated her son as her heir; and modern scholars construe this as meaning that this son would have received the succession (senso) after her death or abdication.  Shortly after she did die at age 68, Emperor Tenji could be said to have acceded to the throne (sokui).

See also
 Regnal name
 List of Japanese era names

Notes

References
 Bramsen, William. (1880). Japanese Chronological Tables: Showing the Date, According to the Julian or Gregorian Calendar, of the First Day of Each Japanese Month, from Tai-kwa 1st year to Mei-ji 6th year (645 AD to 1873 AD): with an Introductory Essay on Japanese Chronology and Calendars. Tokyo: Seishi Bunsha. OCLC 35728014
 Brown, Delmer M. and Ichirō Ishida, eds. (1979).  Gukanshō: The Future and the Past. Berkeley: University of California Press. ;  OCLC 251325323
 Murray, David. (1894). The Story of Japan. New York, G.P. Putnam's Sons.  OCLC 1016340
 Nussbaum, Louis-Frédéric and Käthe Roth. (2005).  Japan encyclopedia. Cambridge: Harvard University Press. ;  OCLC 58053128
 Ponsonby-Fane, Richard Arthur Brabazon. (1959).  The Imperial House of Japan. Kyoto: Ponsonby Memorial Society. OCLC 194887
 Titsingh, Isaac. (1834). Nihon Odai Ichiran; ou,  Annales des empereurs du Japon.  Paris: Royal Asiatic Society, Oriental Translation Fund of Great Britain and Ireland. OCLC 5850691
 Tsuchihashi, Paul Yashita, S.J. (1952). .  Tokyo: Sophia University. OCLC 001291275
 Varley, H. Paul. (1980). A Chronicle of Gods and Sovereigns: Jinnō Shōtōki of Kitabatake Chikafusa. New York: Columbia University Press.  ;  OCLC 6042764
 Zöllner, Reinhard. (2003). Japanische Zeitrechnung: ein Handbuch Munich: Iudicium Verlag. ;  OCLC 249297777

External links
 National Diet Library, "The Japanese Calendar" -- historical overview plus illustrative images from library's collection

      

Japanese eras
Asuka period
655 beginnings
662 endings
7th century in Japan